Valdornón is a parish of the municipality of Gijón / Xixón, in Asturias, Spain.

Its population was 175 in 2012.

Valdornón is located on the southeastern area of Gijón / Xixón. It borders the municipalities of Villaviciosa, Siero and Sariego in the Peña de los Cuatro Jueces, which with its 622 meters is the tallest point of Gijón.

Villages and their neighbourhoods
La Mata
La Campa
Treboria
Quintana
Gorgoyo
Migule
Riosecu
Brañanueva
Salientes
El Caleru
El Caxigal
Los Llagos
El Tiroco
Santolaya
Tarna
El Molín

External links
 Official Toponyms - Principality of Asturias website.
 Official Toponyms: Laws - BOPA Nº 229 - Martes, 3 de octubre de 2006 & ''DECRETO 105/2006, de 20 de septiembre, por el que se determinan los topónimos oficiales del concejo de Gijón."

Parishes in Gijón